The Sengoku period  (30 July 1570) occurred near Lake Biwa in Ōmi Province, Japan, between the allied forces of Oda Nobunaga and  Tokugawa Ieyasu, against the combined forces of the Azai and Asakura clans. It is notable as the first battle that involved the alliance between Nobunaga and Ieyasu, liberated the Oda clan from its unbalanced alliance with the Azai, and saw Nobunaga's prodigious use of firearms.

Background
The battle came as an Azai and Asakura reaction to Oda Nobunaga's sieges of the castles of Odani and Yokoyama, which belonged to the Azai and Asakura clans. It was also referred to as the Battle of Nomura (野村合戦 Nomura Kassen) by the Oda and Azai clans and the Battle of Mitamura (三田村合戦 Mitamura Kassen) by the Asakura clan.

The Oda-Tokugawa allies marched on Odani castle, prompting Nagamasa to send for help from Echizen. Asakura Yoshikage sent an army to support him and the combined Azai-Asakura force marched out to confront Nobunaga in the field. Nobunaga reacted by placing a screen around an Asai fort he had been reducing from Yokoyama castle and advancing to the southern bank of the Anegawa.

The Battle
The following morning on July 30, 1570 the battle began with the Oda and Azai clashing on the right while Tokugawa and Asakura grappled to the left. The battle turned into a melee fought in the middle of the shallow Ane River. For a time, Nobunaga's forces fought the Azai upstream, while the Tokugawa warriors fought the Asakura downstream.

Nobunaga assigned Hashiba Hideyoshi to lead troops into open battle for the first time, Sassa Narimasa led the rear guard, also with support from Hachisuka Masakatsu, Ikoma Ienaga, Kawajiri Hidetaka and Yamauchi Kazutoyo. 
Ieyasu unleashed his second division under Honda Tadakatsu and Sakakibara Yasumasa onto Asakura's left flank, surrounding Asakura Kagetake.

A famous duel involved Magara Jurozaemon, and his eldest son Magara Jurosaburo (Naomoto), who both covered the retreat of the Asakura army to the northern bank. Both were eventually killed however when confronted by four Mikawa samurai, Kosaka Shikibu, Kosaka Gorojiro, Kosaka Rokurogoro, and Yamada Muneroku, and a fifth samurai named Aoki Jozaemon. 
In another notable engagement, an Azai samurai named Endo Kizaemon attempted to take Nobunaga's head, but was stopped short by Takenaka Kyusaku, younger brother of Takenaka Hanbei.  Another Oda samurai, Sakai Masahisa, was under attack from Azai forces under Isono Kazumasa, when he lost his son Sakai Kyūzō. 

After the Tokugawa forces finished off the Asakura, they turned around and attacked the Azai's right flank. The troops of Mino Triumvirate, who were under Inaba Ittetsu, were held in reserve, advancing to hit the Azai's left flank, they even left the task of besieging Yokoyama castle to aid in the battle. The Azai and Asakura's forces were immediately defeated.

There is a battlefield memorial marker in Nomura-cho, Nagahama city, in Shiga Prefecture.

Historical accounts
No reliable source exists to reconstruct the battle. The Battle of Anegawa is vividly presented in the books compiled in the middle or the end of the Edo period. Many of the stories are pure fiction. The only valuable source is the Shinchōkō-ki, describing it very briefly without any notes concerning tactics or details of the battle.  The exact number of the casualties in this battle is unknown. However, the Shinchōkō-ki mentions 1,100 samurai from the Asakura clan being killed in battle. An army of this period had at least several times more ashigaru (commoner footmen) than samurai, so it would be reasonable to assume at least 9,000 men were killed.

According to A.L. Sadler in The Life of Shogun Tokugawa Ieyasu there were 3,170 heads collected by the Oda camp. A good portion were taken by Mikawa men, the Tokugawa force. The Mikawa Fudoki gives a very real picture of the battle: the retainers fighting in groups and the decapitation of soldiers in the confused mingling of armies among the clouds of smoke and dust.

It is often noted that Nobunaga used 500 arquebusiers in this battle. He was famous for his tactical use of firearms but would find himself on the opposite end of skilled arquebus tactics in his Siege of Ishiyama Hongan-ji that year.

Aftermath
Later in October 1570, the Azai and Asakura retaliated by defeating an Oda army at Usayama Castle, near Otsu, in Ōmi Province, an action that killed Mori Yoshinari and Oda Nobuharu, one of Nobunaga's younger brothers.

In popular culture
The battle has been featured in all games of the Samurai Warriors series. However, because Azai Nagamasa was made playable in Samurai Warriors 2, as opposed to the first game where he was a unique non-playable character, the battle had a larger significance. The battle has also fictionally appeared in a revamped form in the Warriors Orochi series, in particular 3 is where its most famous revamp takes place. It also a playable battle in the video game Kessen III.
The battle is also featured in the game Nioh 2 as one of the pivotal events of the main story, which centers on the protagonist's role in the conquests of Oda Nobunaga and the Oda clan.

References

Bibliography
 The Battle of Anegawa on Samurai-archives.com
De Lange, William. Samurai Battles: The Long Road to Unification. Toyp Press (2020) 
 Sadler, A.L. (1937). The Life of Shogun Tokugawa Ieyasu. Rutland: Charles E. Tuttle Co.

1570 in Japan
Anegawa 1570
Anegawa
Anegawa
Azai clan